Callum Anthony Guy (born 25 November 1996) is an English professional footballer who plays as a midfielder for  club Carlisle United, where he is also club captain.

He started his career at Derby County, before playing on loan at Port Vale during the 2016–17 season, and joined Bradford City on loan in January 2018. In August 2018, he joined Blackpool in a deal which was made permanent in January 2019. He left Blackpool for Carlisle United in January 2020 and was voted the club's Player of the Year after picking up 14 assists in the 2020–21 season, at which point he was named as club captain.

Career

Derby County
Guy came through the Derby County youth team from the age of nine to turn professional at the club in February 2015. He played all three Group Stage games for the under-23 team in the EFL Trophy during the 2016–17 season. He joined EFL League One club Port Vale on a half-season loan on 11 January 2017. Nine days later he was named as man of the match on his first team debut for Port Vale in a 2–2 draw with Bury at Vale Park; his performance also saw him named in the Football League Paper's team of the week. Manager Michael Brown said, "I thought he mixed his game up well - short and long passes, broke it up, forward runs, wanting to do well". He was again named as Vale's man of the match after a shortage of defenders saw him play at right-back in a 2–1 home defeat to Bradford City on 25 February. However, he picked up a hamstring injury in mid-March, and was ruled out for the rest of the season.

Guy made his Derby debut on 12 September 2017, in a 3–2 defeat at Barnsley in the EFL Cup. On 12 January 2018, he returned to League One on loan at Bradford City on loan until the end of the 2017–18 season. "Bantams" boss Stuart McCall said that "[he will] give us a little bit extra depth. He is hungry enough, however, to want to push himself into the starting XI". It took until his tenth appearance for Bradford for him to be on the winning side, when he was named as man of the match during a 1–0 victory over Gillingham.

Blackpool
On 31 August 2018, Guy joined League One side Blackpool on a loan deal until the end of 2018, with the deal due to be made permanent in January 2019, at which point he would sign an 18-month contract with the option of a further 12 months on top of that. He scored on his Seasiders debut with a 25-yard volley in a 3–3 draw with Macclesfield Town in an EFL Trophy group stage game on 4 September. The permanent deal was confirmed on 2 January. He ended the 2018–19 season with 24 appearances to his name. On 27 November 2019, he was sent off after receiving two bookings in a 3–1 defeat to Scunthorpe United at Bloomfield Road.

Carlisle United
On 30 January 2020, Guy signed an 18-month deal with EFL League Two side Carlisle United after moving for an undisclosed fee. Carlisle head coach Chris Beech told the club website that Guy was a "marquee signing". However he picked up a knee injury in his third appearance for the "Blues" and was ruled out of action for the rest of the 2019–20 season after undergoing surgery.

Guy made 47 appearances in the 2020–21 season, helping the "Cumbrians" to a tenth-place finish. He made a total of 14 assists, more than any other player in League Two. He signed a new one-year deal in April, with director of football David Holdsworth keen to extend the deal even further. Guy was voted Carlisle United Player of the Year by News and Star readers, attracting 46% of the vote from more than 750 fans. His success carried over into the club's own awards as he picked up the main Player of the Year award.

Following the departure of captain Nick Anderton in July 2021, Guy was appointed club captain ahead of the 2021–22 season. He was a subject of interest for big-spending National League club Wrexham, but was praised by Beech for his commitment to Carlisle. He went on to sign a new deal at Carlisle in September to keep him at Brunton Park until summer 2023 (with a further 12-month option). However Wrexham's interest continued into the January transfer window, forcing new head coach Keith Millen to deny reports that he would be forced to sell Guy. By March, Paul Simpson – yet another new head coach – confirmed that Guy had been ruled out for the rest of the 2021–22 season after suffering medial knee ligament damage.

Style of play
Guy is an energetic 'box-to-box' midfielder.

Personal life
Guy and his partner Abbie have two children: Ava-Leigh (born 2019) and George (born March 2021).

Career statistics

Honours
Individual
Carlisle United F.C. Player of the Year: 2020–21

References

1996 births
Living people
Footballers from Nottingham
English footballers
Association football midfielders
Derby County F.C. players
Port Vale F.C. players
Bradford City A.F.C. players
Blackpool F.C. players
Carlisle United F.C. players
English Football League players